The 1959–60 Greenlandic Football Championship (also known as the  Grønlandturneringen, Fodboldmesterskab i Grønland or ) was the 3rd edition of the Greenlandic Men's Football Championship. Played on a knock-out basis, the final round was held at Gamle Sandbane in Nuuk. It was won by Nanok who defeated Kissaviarsuk-33 in the final.

Background
The first federation to organise a national football championship in Greenland was the GIF, a general sports federation that organised more than just football tournaments, founded on 3 September 1953 at a meeting attended by eleven clubs from Upernavik, Uummannaq, Qeqertarsuatsiaat, Qasigiannguit, Aasiaat, Sisimiut, Maniitsoq, Nuuk, Paamiut and Qaqortoq. The 1954–55 tournament was the first national football tournament and GIF continued to organise the competition, usually announced as Fodboldturneringen, Grønlandturneringen or Fodboldmesterskab i Grønland, until 1970. For the first decade of its existence, the tournament was held sporadically, with iterations often taking more than a year to complete. In 1971 a football specific federation, the Football Association of Greenland (Greenlandic: Kalaallit Nunaanni Isikkamik Arsaattartut Kattuffiat), was founded, and took over the organisation of the tournament.

Competing teams

A total of thirty four teams registered for the 1959–60 season of competition.

 Aassik-43, Narsaq
 Akunnaaq-51, Akunnaaq
 Arssak, Alluitsup Paa
 E-56, Ikerasak
 E-54, Tasiusaq
 GSS, Nuuk
 Iliarssuq, Qeqertarsuatsiaat
 Ipernaq, Ilimanaq
 Isungaq, Illorsuit
 K-33, Qaqortoq
 Kagssagssuk, Maniitsoq
 Kapisillit, Kapisillit
 Kigtorak, Narsaq
 KSP, Qeqertarsuaq
 Kugsak-45, Qasigiannguit
 Malamuk, Uummannaq
 Mingok, Kitsissuarsuit
 Nagdlunguaq-48, Ilulissat
 Nagtoraliq, Paamiut
 Nanok, Qullissat
 Narssarmiutaq, Ammassivik
 Nuuk IL, Nuuk
 Qalaq, Narsarmijit
 Qalaleq, Niaqornat
 Qasuq, Kangaamiut
 Qingmek, Upernavik
 Qingmiarak, Kullorsuaq
 Qoornoq, Qoornoq
 SAK, Sisimiut
 Sapitsoq, Napasoq
 Siuteroq, Nanortalik
 T-41, Aasiaat
 Tusilartoq, Kangeq
 Uiloq, Nivaaq

Format
The tournament was played on a knock-out basis, with the teams divided into regional pools for the draw. As a result of this, the timing of matches was such that teams in certain areas were able to play their matches significantly more quickly than those in others. As a consequence of this, by the end of 1959, the various rounds of the competition do not tie to any overarching time frame and, by the end of 1959, Malamuk and K-33 had qualified for the semi-finals whilst the remaining quarter finals were still to be played.

Recorded results
First preliminary round

Second preliminary round

Competition proper

References

Greenlandic Men's Football Championship seasons
Foo
Foo
Green